Danny Vaughn (born August 7, 1956) is a retired American soccer player who played professionally in the North American Soccer League.

In 1978, Vaughn signed with the Detroit Express of the North American Soccer League.  He remained with the Express through the 1979-1980 indoor season before moving to the Memphis Rogues for the 1980 outdoor season.  In 1981, the team came under new ownership which moved it to Calgary, Alberta, Canada and renamed it the Boomers.  In the fall of 1981, Vaughn signed as a free agent with the Jacksonville Tea Men.

He is a member of the Tacoma-Pierce County Sports Hall of Fame.

References

External links
NASL stats

1956 births
American soccer players
American expatriate soccer players
Detroit Express players
Calgary Boomers players
Expatriate soccer players in Canada
Jacksonville Tea Men players
Living people
Memphis Rogues players
North American Soccer League (1968–1984) indoor players
North American Soccer League (1968–1984) players
Soccer players from Tacoma, Washington
Association football defenders
Association football forwards